Muroya is a Japanese surname. Notable people with the surname include:

, Japanese footballer
, Japanese aviator
, Japanese middle-distance runner
, better known as Yuki Taniguchi, Japanese shogi player

Japanese-language surnames